Ergebnisse der Mathematik und ihrer Grenzgebiete/A Series of Modern Surveys in Mathematics is a series of scholarly monographs published by Springer Science+Business Media. The title literally means "Results in mathematics and related areas". Most of the books were published in German or English, but there were a few in French and Italian. There have been several sequences, or Folge: the original series, neue Folge, and 3.Folge. Some of the most significant mathematical monographs of 20th century appeared in this series.

Original series
The series started in 1932 with publication of Knotentheorie by  Kurt Reidemeister as "Band 1" (English: volume 1). There seems to have been double numeration in this sequence.

Neue Folge
This sequence started in 1950 with the publication of Transfinite Zahlen by Heinz Bachmann. The volumes are consecutively numbered, designated as either "Band" or "Heft". A total of 100 volumes was published, often in multiple editions, but preserving the original numbering within the series.

The ISSN for this sequence is 0071-1136. As of February 2008, P. R. Halmos, P. J. Hilton, R. Remmert, and B. Szökefalvi-Nagy are listed on the series' website as the editors of the defunct 2. Folge.

3. Folge
This sequence started in 1983 with the publication of Galois module structure of algebraic integers by Albrecht Fröhlich.

As of February 2008, the  editor-in-chief is R. Remmert.

External links

Series of mathematics books